The Road to the Heart is a 1909 American short film, a dramedy directed by D. W. Griffith and produced by the Biograph Company of New York City. Starring David Miles, Anita Hendrie and Herbert Yost, the production was filmed in two days in March 1909 at Biograph's studio in Manhattan. It was released in April that year and distributed to theaters on a "split-reel", which was a single film reel that included more than one motion picture. The other picture that accompanied this comedy was the Biograph comedy Trying to Get Arrested.

Plot
Various 1909 film-industry publications provide basic summaries of this photoplay's plot. The trade journal The Moving Picture World is one that describes the storyline in its April 3 issue:

Film reviewer H. A. Downey in The Nickelodeon, another widely read trade journal in 1909, provides in its May edition a far more concise summary of Griffith's screenplay than the one found in The Moving Picture World. Downey describes the film as "A verification of the theory that the road to the heart is through the stomach, as set forth in the case of Miguel, who, disapproving of his daughter's marriage, drives her from home, but relents for the sake of a hearty meal."

Another summary of this short's plot is in the extensive 1985 publication Early Motion Pictures: The Paper Print Collection in the Library of Congress. The following was composed by Library of Congress staff after reviewing a paper roll of small photographic prints preserved in the LC's collection. Those prints date from 1909 and were produced directly, frame-by-frame from Biograph's now-lost 35mm master negative of The Road to the Heart:

Cast

David Miles as Miguel, wealthy Mexican ranchero
Anita Hendrie as Vinuella, Miguel's wife
Herbert Yost (also credited Barry O'Moore) as José
Florence Lawrence as Miguel's daughter and José's wife
John R. Cumpson as Chinese man
Clara T. Bracy as Irish cook
Mack Sennett as vaquero (cowboy)
Arthur V. Johnson as vaquero (cowboy)

Production
The screenplay for this short is credited to director Griffith, who shot the picture at Biograph's headquarters and main studio, which in 1909 were located inside a renovated brownstone mansion at 11 East 14th Street in New York City. Filming was completed in just two daysMarch 4 and 5, 1909by Biograph cinematographer Arthur Marvin.

The short's "anonymous" actors
Compiling and verifying cast members in early Biograph productions such as The Road to the Heart is made more difficult by the fact that Biograph, as a matter of company policy, did not begin publicly crediting its performers and identifying them in film-industry publications or in newspapers advertisements until four years after the release of this short. In its April 5, 1913 issue, the Chicago-based trade journal Motography in a news item titled "Biograph Identities Revealed" announces that "at last" Biograph "is ready to make known its players." That news item also informs filmgoers that for the price of ten cents they can purchase a poster from Biograph on which the names and respective portraits of 26 of the company’s principal actors were featured.

The co-stars of this short were among many early Biograph players who performed anonymously and were consistently uncredited in their screen appearances for the studio. Florence Lawrence, in the role of Miguel's daughter in this film, was known in 1909 to theater audiences only as the "Biograph Girl", although within a few years after this comedy's release, she would be widely publicized as one of the top actors in the United States' motion-picture industry.

Release and reception
With a film length of 618 feet and an original runtime of between nine and ten minutes, The Road to the Heart was released and distributed by Biograph on a split-reel with the 344-foot comedy Trying to Get Arrested. Few impartial reviews or comments about the film can be found in either 1909 trade publications or in city and small-town newspapers that year. Most newspaper descriptions of the short are contained in theater advertisements that circulated throughput various communities in the weeks and months after the film's release.

A Biograph "dramedy"
In both 1909 publications and in more current references, the genre or production designation for The Road to the Heart varies. The production is cited as a drama or a "dramatic" in period release schedules and in Biograph advertisements for the film in trade journals; yet, in theater bills and promotions for the short in available 1909 newspapers, The Road to the Heart is cited at times as a drama but more often as a comedy. The previously cited 1985 reference Early Motion Pictures: The Paper Print Collection in the Library of Congress as well as the online source the Internet Movie Database also categorize the film as a comedy.

In August 1909 the Grand Theater in Brunswick, Georgia promoted the film in the local newspaper as "a very clever farce comedy that is sure to please." The Electric Theatre in Conway, Arkansas, categorizedThe Road to the Heart as "comic" in its lineup of motion pictures, along with its split-reel companion comedy Trying to Get Arrested, which the theatre erroneously labeled He Tries to Be Arrested. On the other hand, the Jewel Theatre in Astoria, Oregon, like Biograph's promotions in trade publications, advertised the short as a "Dramatic". All of these varying descriptions and others have led to general uncertainties about the film's actual genre or type, so much so that the online reference the "Progressive Silent Film List" at Silent Era simply categorizes the short with question marks: "[?]Drama?". Given such uncertainties associated with the presence of both dramatic and comic elements in this short's plot, the production is perhaps best classified as a dramedy.

Preservation status
A visual record of The Road to the Heart does exist. The Library of Congress (LC)) holds a 241-foot roll of paper images printed frame-by-frame directly from the comedy's original 35mm master negative. Submitted by Biograph to the United States government shortly before the film's release, the roll is part of the original documentation required by federal authorities for motion-picture companies to obtain copyright protection for their productions.

While the LC's paper print record is not projectable, such paper copies can be transferred onto modern polyester-based safety film stock for screening. In fact, during the 1950s and early 1960s, Kemp R. Niver and other LC staff restored more than 3,000 early paper rolls of film images from the library's collection and transferred many to safety stock. The UCLA Film and Television Archive, for example, has in its collection such a reproduction, but not one of The Road to the Heart. Instead, the archive has a copy of the first film directed by D. W. Griffith, the short Adventures of Dollie. That projectable reproduction was created from a copy of the LC's paper print of that 1908 film.

See also
 D. W. Griffith filmography

Notes

References

External links
 
 

1909 films
1900s comedy-drama films
American black-and-white films
American silent short films
Films directed by D. W. Griffith
1909 short films
Surviving American silent films
1900s English-language films
1900s American films
Comedy-drama short films
Silent American comedy-drama films